Kowloon Bay is a body of water within Victoria Harbour and an area within Kowloon, Hong Kong.

The bay is located at the east of the Kowloon Peninsula and north of Hong Kong Island. It is the eastern portion of Victoria Harbour, between Hung Hom and Lei Yue Mun. The bay was divided into half when the 13/31 runway of the former Kai Tak International Airport was constructed in the middle of the bay in the mid-1950s.

The reclamation of north-eastern Kowloon Bay near Ngau Tau Kok is also named Kowloon Bay. It was formerly known as Ngau Tau Kok Industrial Area. After the construction of MTR Kowloon Bay station, the area is referred to as Kowloon Bay. The area near the MTR station is residential while the area near the shore is industrial. The area is traditionally an extension of Ngau Tau Kok, and thus facilities such as Ngau Tau Kok Police Station are located there.

Administration
Administratively, the reclamation of Kowloon Bay and water east of the runway except the airport area is part of Kwun Tong District. The airport and the waters of the district, on the other hand, belong to Kowloon City District.

Geography
The bay has undergone massive reclamation over the past century. Even San Po Kong, which is now far from the coast, was reclaimed from the bay in the early days.

The western part of the bay is now protected from the sea by a breakwater, and forms the To Kwa Wan typhoon shelter. A small barrel rock, the Kowloon Rock, is in the typhoon shelter. Other barrel rocks, the Channel Rock and the Hoi Sham Island (also To Kwa Wan Island), are now connected to land at the former Kai Tak International Airport runway and at To Kwa Wan respectively, by land reclamation.

Features
The former Kai Tak International Airport was built on reclaimed land in Kowloon Bay and its one and only runway, which juts out into the bay, is surrounded by water on three sides. The airport was closed in 1998 and now a cruise terminal occupies a part of the site.

Kowloon Bay Depot, the first MTR depot, is located in the area.

Buildings
 Amoy Gardens, large private estate
 Electrical and Mechanical Services Department Headquarters
 Enterprise Square Five, a complex comprising MegaBox shopping mall and two office buildings
 Goldin Financial Global Centre, an office building
 Hong Kong Pacific Tower, a grade-A commercial building
 Kai Yip Estate, a public housing estate
 Kowloonbay International Trade & Exhibition Centre (KITEC), an exhibition and convention centre which also hosts many concerts.
 Richland Gardens, a Private Sector Participation Scheme estate
 Skyline Tower 2, an office tower
 Telford Gardens, a private housing estate built on top of MTR's Kowloon Bay station depot
 East Kowloon Cultural Centre, opening in 2021

Economy
Fung Seng Enterprises has its head office in Kowloon Bay.

Education
Schools and institutions are scarce in this district. The most famous ones include the SPACE of the University of Hong Kong, Town Center of City University of Hong Kong and YCH Law Chan Chor Si College.

Kowloon Bay is in Primary One Admission (POA) School Net 46. Within the school net are multiple aided schools (operated independently but funded with government money); no government primary schools are in this net.

Future
In the 1990s, there were plans to convert the bay (reclaiming part or even the entire bay) and the former airport site into an in-city new town which would house 240 to 340 thousand residents and a sports stadium. The reduction in demand for land, environmental issues, and public outcry led to a revision of the project. The scheme would not comply with the Protection of the Harbour Ordinance. Hence, the Kai Tak Development plans do not include any land reclamation. A cruise terminal opened on the southern part of the runway.

Transport
The reclamation is serviced by MTR Kowloon Bay station on the Kwun Tong line which is beside Telford Plaza, along with many bus routes along Kwun Tong Road.

See also
 Public housing estates in Ngau Tau Kok and Kowloon Bay
 List of bays in Hong Kong
 List of places in Hong Kong

References

 
Victoria Harbour
Places in Hong Kong
Bays of Hong Kong
New Kowloon